The 2021 AFC Cup qualifying play-offs were played from 7 April to 15 August 2021. A total of seven teams competed in the qualifying play-offs to decide three of the 38 places in the group stage of the 2021 AFC Cup.

Teams
The following 7 teams, split into five zones (West Asia Zone, Central Asia Zone, South Asia Zone, ASEAN Zone, East Asia Zone), entered the qualifying play-offs, consisting of three rounds:
4 teams entered in the preliminary round 1.
3 teams entered in the preliminary round 2.

Format

In the qualifying play-offs, each tie was played as a single match. Extra time and penalty shoot-out were used to decide the winner if necessary.

Schedule
The schedule of each round was as follows.

Bracket

The bracket of the qualifying play-offs for each zone was determined based on each team's association ranking, with the team from the higher-ranked association hosting the match. The one winner of preliminary round 2 (from ASEAN Zone) and one winner of the play-off round (from South Zone) advanced to the group stage to join the 35 direct entrants.

Play-off West Asia
Both teams advanced to Group C.

Play-off South Asia
Bengaluru advanced to Group D.

Play-off ASEAN 1
Winners of Preliminary round 2 would have advanced to Group G.

Play-off ASEAN 2
Persipura Jayapura advanced to Group H, while  Visakha and  Lalenok United advanced to Group I.

Preliminary round 1

Summary
A total of four teams played in the preliminary round 1.

|+South Asia Zone

South Asia Zone

Preliminary round 2

Summary
A total of eight teams played in the preliminary round 2: six teams which entered in this round, and two winners of the preliminary round 1.

|+South Asia Zone

|+ASEAN Zone

South Asia Zone

ASEAN Zone

Play-off round

Summary
A total of eight teams played in the play-off round: four teams which entered in this round, and four winners of the preliminary round 2.

|+West Asia Zone

|+South Asia Zone

|+ASEAN Zone

West Asia Zone

South Asia Zone

ASEAN Zone

Notes

References

External links

AFC Cup 2021 , stats.the-AFC.com

1
April 2021 sports events in Asia
August 2021 sports events in Asia